Impostor is a 2002 American science fiction psychological thriller film based upon the 1953 short story "Impostor" by Philip K. Dick. The film starred Gary Sinise, Madeleine Stowe, Vincent D'Onofrio, and Mekhi Phifer and was directed by Gary Fleder.

Plot
The film takes place in 2079. Forty-five years earlier, Earth was attacked by a hostile and implacable alien civilization from Alpha Centauri. Force field domes are put in place to protect cities, and a totalitarian global military government is established to effect the war and the survival of humans. The Centaurians have never been physically seen.

The film follows Spencer Olham (Gary Sinise), a designer of top-secret government weapons. One day while on his way to work, he is arrested by Major Hathaway (Vincent D'Onofrio) of the Earth Security Administration (ESA), being identified as a replicant created by the aliens. The ESA intercepted an alien transmission which cryptanalysts decoded as programming Olham's target to be the Chancellor, whom he was scheduled to meet. Such replicants are perfect biological copies of existing humans, complete with transplanted memories, and do not know they are replicants. Each has a powerful "U-bomb" in their chest in the exact design of a human heart, which can only be detected by dissection or a high-tech medical scan, since it only arms itself and detonates when it gets in close proximity to its target. Detection via the special scan works by comparing against a previous scan, if there was one.

Major Hathaway begins interrogating Olham. As Hathaway is about to drill out Olham's chest to find the bomb, Olham breaks loose and escapes, accidentally killing his friend Nelson (Tony Shalhoub) in the process. With the help of underground stalker Cale (Mekhi Phifer), Olham avoids capture and sneaks into the hospital where his wife Maya (Madeleine Stowe) is an administrator to get the high-tech scan redone and prove he's not a replicant. But the scan is interrupted by security forces before it can deliver the answer.

That evening, after fleeing from the city, Olham and Maya are eventually captured by Hathaway's troops in a forest near an alien crash site, close to the spot where they spent a romantic weekend just a week or so before Olham's arrest. Inside the ship they discover the corpse of the real Maya, and Hathaway shoots and kills the replicant before she can detonate. Hathaway thinks he has killed the true impostor, but as his men move debris away from the Centauri ship, the real Spencer Olham's body is revealed. At that moment, Olham realizes aloud that both Maya and himself really are alien replicants, and the secondary trigger (his awareness of what he truly is) detonates his U-bomb, destroying himself, Hathaway, his troops, and everything else in a wide area in a fiery nuclear explosion.

In the final scene, the news announces that Hathaway and the Olhams were killed in an alien enemy attack, implying that the government covered up or are unaware of the truth. Cale wonders if he ever really knew Olham's true identity.

Cast
 Gary Sinise as Spencer Olham
 Madeleine Stowe as Maya Olham
 Vincent D'Onofrio as Major D.H. Hathaway
 Mekhi Phifer as Cale
 Tony Shalhoub as Nelson Gittes
 Tim Guinee as Dr. Carone
 Gary Dourdan as Captain Burke
 Lindsay Crouse as Chancellor
 Clarence Williams III as Secretary of Defense (uncredited)
 Elizabeth Pena as Midwife
 Shane Brolly as Lt. Burrows
 Golden Brooks as Cale's Sister
 Ted King as RMR Operator
 Rachel Luttrell as Scan Room Nurse

Production
The film adaptation was originally planned to be one segment of a three-part science fiction anthology film titled Light Years, but was the only segment filmed before the project fell apart. The other shorts were to be adaptations of Isaac Asimov's story "The Last Question" by Bryan Singer and Donald A. Wollheim's story "Mimic" by Matthew Robbins. "Mimic" had already been adapted into a film of the same name, but with a different script.

The short was originally written by Scott Rosenberg, with revisions by Mark Protosevich and Caroline Case. When it was decided to expand the short into a feature-length film, additional scenes were written by Richard Jeffries, Ehren Kruger, and David Twohy.

Burn areas in Running Springs, California, were used to create the spacecraft crash site. Sets were constructed in Angeles National Forest and in numerous areas around Los Angeles. Most of the interiors were built on stage in Manhattan Beach, including a two-story hospital and 3-story pharmacy, and a commuter transport station with articulated commuter "bugs". Other filming locations included the Coachella Valley.

The movie was made on an estimated $40 million budget.

Reception

Critical response

Impostor received negative reviews from critics. Rotten Tomatoes gives the film a score of 24% based on 96 reviews. The site's critical consensus reads, "With its low production value and uninspired direction, Impostor comes off as a mixture of The Fugitive and Blade Runner, only not as good or as involving."
Metacritic gives the film a score of 33% based on 26 reviews.

James Berardinelli of ReelViews gave the film two-and-a-half stars (out of four), saying "there are a few moderately diverting subplots and the storyline eventually gets somewhere", but added that "Impostor wears out its welcome by the half-hour mark, and doesn't do anything to stir things up until the climax. You could spend the entire midsection of this movie in the bathroom and not miss much".
William Arnold of the Seattle Post-Intelligencer gave the film a mildly positive review, praising lead actor Gary Sinise's ability to "hold the film together and provide a strong, sympathetic human focus. The movie's atmosphere has a very definite Blade Runner feel".
Maitland McDonagh of TV Guide gave the film three stars out of four, saying it packed "a real emotional wallop", but suggested that it would have worked better as the 40-minute short film it was originally intended to be.

Keith Phipps of The Onion's The A.V. Club gave the film a negative review, saying that "it essentially uses the setup of [the story] as a bookend to one long, dull chase scene".
Robert Koehler of Variety also criticized the film, calling it "a stubbornly unexciting ride into the near future".

A. O. Scott of The New York Times offered a sardonic view of the movie's "dark view of the future" ("a badly lighted one, that is"), of the editing ("pointlessly hyperkinetic"), and of the "twist" ending ("meant to be clouded with ambiguity, but really it is unequivocally happy because it means the movie is over").

Box office 
The film earned a little over $6 million at the box office in the United States and Canada, with the estimated worldwide of over $8 million, thus making it a box office failure.

References

External links
 
 
 
 
 
 
 

2001 films
Alpha Centauri in fiction
Films based on short fiction
Films based on works by Philip K. Dick
American science fiction action films
Films directed by Gary Fleder
2001 science fiction action films
Alien invasions in films
Films set in the 2070s
Films shot in California
Films with screenplays by David Twohy
Films with screenplays by Ehren Kruger
Films scored by Mark Isham
Dimension Films films
Films set in 2079
2000s English-language films
2000s American films